Nicanor or Nikanor is the name of:

People

Ancient history 
 Nicanor (father of Balacrus), 4th century BC
 Nicanor (son of Parmenion) (4th-century–330 BC), 4th century BC; a Macedonian officer under Alexander
 Nicanor of Stageira, 4th century BC; a messenger sent by Alexander to the 324 Olympics
 Nicanor (satrap), 4th century BC; Macedonian officer, governor of Media under Antigonus
 Nicanor (Antipatrid general) (died 318 BC), 4th century BC; an officer of Cassandrus
 Nicanor (Ptolemaic general), 4th century BC
 Nicanor of Syria (died 222 BC), 3rd century BC; assassin of Seleucus III
 Nicanor (Macedonian general), 3rd century BC; a Macedonian general under Philip V
 Nicanor of Epirus, 3rd–2nd century BC; son of Myrton and supporter of Charops of Epirus
 Saevius Nicanor, 3rd or 2nd century BC; Roman grammarian
 Nicanor (Seleucid general) (died 161 BC), 2nd century BC; defeated by Judas Maccabaeus
 Nicanor of Cyrene, date unknown; author of the Metonomasias
 Nicanor the Deacon (died 76 AD), 1st century AD; one of the Seven Deacons of early Christianity
 Nicanor Stigmatias, 2nd century AD; the great Homeric grammarian

Modern period 
 Nicanor Abelardo (1893–1934), Filipino composer who composed over a hundred of Kundiman songs, especially before the Second World War
 Nicanor Carmona (1842–1940), Peruvian politician in the early 20th century
 Nicanor de Carvalho (born 1947), a manager of the Kashiwa Reysol soccer team in Japan in the 1990s
 Nicanor Duarte (born 1956), President of Paraguay 2003–2008
 Nicanor Faeldon (born 1965), Captain in the Philippine Marines and an alleged leader of the Oakwood Mutiny in 2003
 Nikanor Grujić (1810–1887), Orthodox bishop, Serbian patriarch, writer, poet, orator and translator
 Nikanor Hoveka (c. 1875–1951), Chief of the Ovambanderu in South-West Africa
 Nikanor Longinov, Governor of Yekaterinoslav Governorate (1832–1836)
 Nicanor Costa Méndez (1922–1992), Foreign Minister of Argentina under Presidents Juan Carlos Onganía and Leopoldo Galtieri, and ambassador to Chile from 1962 to 1964
 Nicanor Perlas (born 1950), Filipino activist and a recipient of the Right Livelihood Award in 2003
 Nicanor Parra (1914–2018), Chilean antipoet
 Nicanor Tiongson, Filipino critic, creative writer and academic
 Nicanor Yñiguez (1915–2007), Filipino politician
 Nicanor Zabaleta (1907–1993), Basque-Spanish virtuoso and popularizer of the harp
 Nikanor Teratologen, author
 Patriarch Nicanor of Alexandria from 1866 and 1869

Other
 Nikanor plc, in the Democratic Republic of Congo, former holding company merged into Katanga Mining which is now owned by Glencore

hr:Nikanor
ru:Никанор
sh:Nikanor